Taileflaith is a rare Gaelic-Irish woman's name from the early Irish historic era, found in the kingdoms of Munster and Laigin.

Bearers of the name

Almost the only one attested is Taileflaith ingen Cathail, described as mnaoi an Dunchada, .i. Tualaith, inghean Cathail m. Finguine, ri Mumhan, who died as Queen of Leinster between 749 and 754. Her husband was Dúnchad mac Murchado (died 728), and her father was Cathal mac Finguine of the Eóganacht Glendamnach (died 742), who was King of Munster or Cashel and High King of Ireland.

Taileflaith's son, Cellach mac Dúnchada (died 776) was a king of Leinster and ancestor of the Uí Dúnlainge of the kingdom of Laigin. The families of Ó Broin, Ó Tuathail, and Mac Gilla Mo-Cholmóg are the most prominent of her descendants.

References

 http://medievalscotland.org/kmo/AnnalsIndex/Feminine/Tuathflaith.shtml

Irish-language feminine given names